Nick Cooney (born c. 1981) is a Managing Partner at Lever VC, an investment fund focused on alternative protein companies.

He co-founded The Good Food Institute and was co-founder and Managing Trustee of New Crop Capital. He is the author of three books:  Change of Heart (2010), Veganomics (2013), and How To Be Great At Doing Good (2015). He previously worked for the non-profit organizations Mercy for Animals and Farm Sanctuary and was the founder of the non-profit organization The Humane League.

Early life and education
Nick Cooney was born and raised in Philadelphia, Pennsylvania. Cooney received a bachelor's degree in Non-Violence Studies from Hofstra University in 2003.

Policy and non-profit work 
In 2005, Nick Cooney founded The Humane League in Philadelphia, a non-profit organization that works to protect animal welfare. Cooney is one of several people who provided information used in the writing of the book Striking at the Roots: A Practical Guide to Animal Activism (2008) by Mark Hawthorne.

Since then, Nick Cooney's work promoting alternative proteins and animal protection has been featured in media outlets including Bloomberg, CNBC, Yahoo Finance, Quartz, Upside, Food Navigator, Just-Food, and the Wall Street Journal. He has lectured internationally at conferences and campuses including Harvard, Yale, in Luxembourg, and in Washington, D.C.

Cooney previously worked as campaign coordinator at the non-profit Farm Sanctuary and as executive vice president at non-profit Mercy for Animals. He is currently a director with the non-profit Lever Foundation.

Work with The Good Food Institute and New Crop Capital 
Nick Cooney is former board chairman and co-founder of The Good Food Institute.  He is also co-founder and former managing trustee of New Crop Capital, a private venture capital trust that invests in plant-based and cultured meat, dairy, and egg companies. These two organizations collaborate to support the plant-based and cultured food companies.

Work with Lever VC 
Nick Cooney is founder and currently Managing Partner at Lever VC, a U.S.-Asian venture capital fund investing in early stage alternative protein companies.

Books

See also

Venture capital
Cultured meat
Animal protectionism

Notes

Interviews

Other articles

External links

Lever VC
NickCooney.com
 The Good Food Institute
 New Crop Capital

Living people
Writers from Philadelphia
Year of birth missing (living people)